Tropidophis taczanowskyi, also known commonly as Taczanowski's dwarf boa, is a species of snake in the family Tropidophiidae. The species is native to northern South America.

Etymology
Both the specific name, taczanowskyi, and the common name, Taczanowski's dwarf boa, are in honor of Polish zoologist Władysław Taczanowski.

Geographic range
T. taczanowskyi is found in Ecuador and Peru.

Habitat

Diet
Taczanowski's dwarf boa preys upon frogs.

Reproduction
T. taczanowskyi is viviparous.

References

Further reading
Boulenger GA (1893). Catalogue of the Snakes in the British Museum (Natural History). Volume I., Containing the Families ... Boidæ ... London: Trustees of the British Museum (Natural History). (Taylor and Francis, printers). xiii + 448 pp. + Plates I-XXVIII. (Ungalia taczanowskyi, p. 111).
Freiberg M (1982). Snakes of South America. Hong Kong: T.F.H. Publications. 189 pp. . (Tropidophis taczanowskyi, p. 88).
Steindachner F (1880). "Über eine neue peruanische Ungalia-Art, Ungalia taczanowskyi". Sitzungberichte der Kaiserlichen Akademie der Wissenschaften, Mathematisch-Naturwissenschaften Classe, Wien 80 (1): 522-525 + one plate. (Ungalia taczanowsyi, new species). (in German).
Stull OG (1928). "A Revision of the Genus Tropidophis ". Occasional Papers of the Museum of Zoology, University of Michigan (195): 1-49. (Tropidophis taczanowskyi, new combination, p. 21).

Tropidophiidae
Reptiles described in 1880
Snakes of South America
Reptiles of Peru
Reptiles of Ecuador